Gyalideopsis chicaque is a species of lichen in the family Gomphillaceae.

Habitat and etymology

The lichen is only known from a single but well-developed collection found in a montane rainforest over compacted soil in Chicaque Natural Park, Altiplano Cundiboyacense in San Antonio del Tequendama, Cundinamarca, and the species epithet refers to the type locality. The park is located at 30 minutes from the Colombian capital Bogotá. Chicaque comes from Muysccubun, the language of the indigenous Muisca who inhabited the area before the Spanish conquest and means "our struggle".

Description
Gyalideopsis chicaque is characterized by its small, broadly sessile, dark-brown apothecia lacking pruina and very small, submuriform ascospores. There are no similar species growing on rock or soil.

See also
 List of flora and fauna named after the Muisca

References

Ostropales
Lichen species
Lichens of Colombia
Altiplano Cundiboyacense
Muysccubun
Lichens described in 2011
Taxa named by Robert Lücking